McGregor, now located on SR 547 in Port Gibson, Mississippi, is a country house built in 1835. It was designed in Greek Revival style. It is privately owned and not open to the public.

The one-and-a-half story house was designed and/or built by planter and Judge Peter Aaron Van Dorn (1773-1837) for one of his daughters, likely as a wedding present. The gable-frame wooden residence in built on the center hall plan. The house has inset galleries along the north (front) and south (rear) facades. About 1850, an ell was added to the west facade.

Van Dorn was born in New Jersey  in 1773, had a law degree from Princeton, and came to the Mississippi Territory at the age of twenty-one. He settled in Port Gibson about 1811, setting up a law practice, marrying, and getting involved in local civic affairs. After Mississippi was admitted as a state, Van Dorn was appointed a judge on the Orphan's Court. He also owned a 1,000-acre plantation on the Yazoo River. About 1830 he had built his own fine residence, known as Van Dorn House, on a hill in Port Gibson. It also is listed on the National Register of Historic Places.

McGregor was listed on the National Register of Historic Places in 1979.  The listing included a contributing building on a  area.

See also
Van Dorn House
Earl Van Dorn

References

Houses on the National Register of Historic Places in Mississippi
Greek Revival houses in Mississippi
Houses completed in 1835
Houses in Claiborne County, Mississippi
National Register of Historic Places in Claiborne County, Mississippi
Port Gibson, Mississippi